The Human Protein Atlas (HPA) is a Swedish-based program started in 2003 with the aim to map all the human proteins in cells, tissues and organs using integration of various omics technologies, including antibody-based imaging, mass spectrometry-based proteomics, transcriptomics and systems biology. All the data in the knowledge resource is open access to allow scientists both in academia and industry to freely access the data for exploration of the human proteome. In December 2022, version 22 was launched where two new sections, a Human Disease Blood Atlas and a Structure resource section, were introduced, both relying heavily on AI-based prediction modelling and machine learning. 

The resource now includes twelve separate sections with complementary information about all human proteins. All data has been updated on the approximately 5 million individual web pages. The Human Protein Atlas program has already contributed to several thousands of publications in the field of human biology and disease and was selected by the organization ELIXIR as a European core resource due to its fundamental importance for a wider life science community. The HPA consortium is funded by the Knut and Alice Wallenberg Foundation.

Twelve sections
The Human Protein Atlas consists of twelve sections:
 The Tissue section of the Human Protein Atlas focuses on the expression profiles in human tissues of genes both on the mRNA and protein level. The protein expression data from 44 normal human tissue types is derived from antibody-based protein profiling using immunohistochemistry. All underlying images of immunohistochemistry stained normal tissues are available together with knowledge-based annotation of protein expression levels.
 The Brain section provides comprehensive spatial profiling of the brain, including overview of protein expression in the mammalian brain based on integration of data from human, pig and mouse. Transcriptomics data combined with affinity-based protein in situ localization down to single cell detail is available in this brain-centric sub atlas of the Human Protein Atlas. The data presented are for human genes and their one-to-one orthologues in pig and mouse. Gene summary pages provide the hierarchical expression landscape form 13 main regions of the brain to individual nuclei and subfields for every protein coding gene. For selected proteins, high content images are available to explore the cellular and subcellular protein distribution. In addition, the Brain section contains lists of genes with elevated expression in one or a group of regions to help the user identify unique protein expression profiles linked to physiology and function.
 The Single Cell Type section contains information based on single cell RNA sequencing (scRNAseq) data from 25 human tissues and peripheral blood mononuclear cells (PBMCs), together with in-house generated immunohistochemically stained tissue sections visualizing the corresponding spatial protein expression patterns. The scRNAseq analysis was based on publicly available genome-wide expression data and comprises all protein-coding genes in 444 individual cell type clusters corresponding to 15 different cell type groups. A specificity and distribution classification was performed to determine the number of genes elevated in these single cell types, and the number of genes detected in one, several or all cell types, respectively. The genes expressed in each of the cell types can be explored in interactive UMAP plots and bar charts, with links to corresponding immunohistochemical stainings in human tissues.
 The Tissue Cell Type section contains cell type expression specificity predictions for all human protein coding genes, generated using integrated network analysis of publicly available bulk RNAseq data. A specificity classification is used to predict which genes are enriched in each constituent cell type within an individual tissue. The data can be explored on a tissue-by-tissue basis, together with in-house generated immunohistochemically stained tissue sections. In addition, a core cell type analysis focuses on the cell types found in all, or the majority, of the profiled tissues, e.g., endothelial cells or macrophages. Here, genes with predicted specificity in these core cell types in multiple tissues are detailed.
 The Pathology section contains information based on mRNA and protein expression data from 17 different forms of human cancer, together with millions of in-house generated immunohistochemically stained tissue sections images and Kaplan-Meier plots showing the correlation between mRNA expression of each human protein gene and cancer patient survival.
 The Immune Cell section contains single cell information on genome-wide RNA expression profiles of human protein-coding genes covering various B- and T-cells, monocytes, granulocytes and dendritic cells. The transcriptomics analysis covers 18 cell types isolated with cell sorting and includes classification based on specificity, distribution and expression cluster across all immune cells.
 The Blood Proteins section presents estimated plasma concentrations of the proteins detected in human blood from mass spectrometry-based proteomics studies, published immune assay data and a longitudinal study based on proximity extension assay (PEA). Further, an analysis of the “human secretome” is presented including annotation of the genes predicted to be actively secreted to human blood, as well as to other compartments or organ systems of the human body such as the digestive tract or the brain.
 The Subcellular section of the Human Protein Atlas provides high-resolution insights into the expression and spatiotemporal distribution of proteins encoded by 13041 genes (65% of the human protein-coding genes). For each gene, the subcellular distribution of the protein has been investigated by immunofluorescence (ICC-IF) and confocal microscopy in up to three different cell lines, selected from a subset of 36 of the cell lines found in the Cell Line Section. Upon image analysis, the subcellular localization of the protein has been classified into one or more of 35 different organelles and fine subcellular structures. In addition, the section includes an annotation of genes that display single-cell variation in protein expression levels and/or subcellular distribution, as well as an extended analysis of cell cycle dependency of such variations.
 The Cell Line section contains information on genome-wide RNA expression profiles of human protein-coding genes in 69 human cell lines. The transcriptomics analysis includes classification based on specificity, distribution and expression cluster analysis across all cell lines.
 The Metabolic section enables exploration of protein function and tissue-specific gene expression in the context of the most curated human metabolic network. For proteins involved in metabolism, a metabolic summary is provided that describes the metabolic subsystems/pathways, cellular compartments, and number of reactions associated with the protein. Over 120 manually curated metabolic pathway maps facilitate the visualization of each protein's participation in different metabolic processes. Each pathway map is accompanied by a heatmap detailing the mRNA levels across 256 different tissue types for all proteins involved in the metabolic pathway. Further details and full cellular compartment maps are available at metabolicatlas.org.
 The Disease section contains information on protein levels in blood in patients with different diseases and highlights proteins associated with these diseases using differential expression analysis and a disease prediction strategy based on machine-learning.
 The Structure section contains information about the three-dimensional structure of human proteins.

Additional features
In addition to the twelve sections of HPA, exploring gene and protein expression, there are various features available at the HPA website to assist the research community, including integrated external resources, such as Metabolic Atlas, educational material and free downloadable data.

 The “Learn” section of HPA includes educational resources, including information regarding antibody-based applications and techniques, a histology dictionary and educational 3D videos. The dictionary is an interactive tool for free full-screen exploration of whole slide images of normal human organs and tissues, cancer tissues and cell structures, guided with detailed annotations of all major structural elements. Educational videos have been produced by HPA, depicting the exploration of the human body in 3D, using antibody-based profiling of tissues and light sheet microscopy. The movies are available at the HPA website as well as on a YouTube channel.
 Datasets used in HPA are made freely available to encourage further studies within the research community. Access to the extensive datasets is given through the downloadable data page of HPA, wherein 29 different downloadable files are available, containing genome‐wide data across various assays.

History
The Human Protein Atlas program was started in 2003 and funded by the non-profit organization Knut and Alice Wallenberg Foundation (KAW). The main site of the project is the Royal Institute of Technology (KTH), School of Engineering Sciences in Chemistry, Biotechnology and Health (Stockholm, Sweden). Additionally, the project involves research groups at Uppsala University, Karolinska Institutet, Chalmers University of Technology and Lund University, as well as several present and past international collaborations initiated with research groups in Europe, the United States, South Korea, China, and India. Professor Mathias Uhlén is the director of the program.

The research underpinning the start of the exploration of the whole human proteome in the Human Protein Atlas program was carried out in the late 1990s and early 2000s. A pilot study employing an affinity proteomics strategy using affinity-purified antibodies raised against recombinant human protein fragments was carried out for a chromosome-wide protein profiling of chromosome 21. Other projects were also carried out to establish processes for parallel and automated affinity purification of mono-specific antibodies and their validation.

Research
Antibodies and antigens, produced in the Human Protein Atlas workflow, are used in research projects to study potential biomarkers in various diseases, such as breast cancer, prostate cancer, colon cancer, diabetes, autoimmune diseases, ovarian cancer and renal failure.

Researchers involved with Human Protein Atlas projects, are sharing protocols and method details in an open-access group on protocols.io. A large effort is put into validating the antibody reagents used for profiling of tissues and cells, and the HPA has implemented stringent antibody validation criteria as suggested by the International Working Group for Antibody Validation (IWGAV).

Collaborations
The Human Protein Atlas program has participated in 9 EU research projects ENGAGE, PROSPECTS, BIO_NMD, AFFINOMICS, CAGEKID, EURATRANS, ITFoM, DIRECT and PRIMES.

See also 
 Expression Atlas
 The Cancer Genome Atlas

References 
  Text was copied from The Human Protein Atlas, which is available under a Creative Commons Attribution-ShareAlike 3.0 Unported license.

Biological databases
Proteomics
Online databases